Margarella violacea is a species of small sea snail, a marine gastropod mollusk in the family Calliostomatidae, the top snails.

Description 
The animal is pale beige in color and has a pair of cephalic tentacles. The eyes are large and black. The shell is small and wider than it is high. The size of an adult shell varies between 7 mm and 13.5 mm, but can be up to 8.4 mm in height and 9.9 mm in diameter. The purplish-pink shell is imperforate, orbicular-conical, thin and smooth, and is covered in fine pink or dark pink spiral lines. There are four swollen whorls. The suture is scarcely impressed. The rounded-quadrangular aperture is angular above, and subangular at the base of slightly thickened and arcuate columella. The umbilico-columellar tract is excavated.

Distribution
This species occurs in the Atlantic Ocean on the coast of Argentina and the Falkland Islands, i.e. in the Magellanic Region.

References

 Hombron, J. B. and H. Jacquinot. 1848. Voyage au Pôle Sud et dans l'Océanie.  Zoologie, Mollusques pls. 9, 11–12, 14, 16–17, 19, 21–25. Gide et J. Baudry: Paris.
 Gould, A. A. 1852. Mollusca & Shells. United States Exploring Expedition 12: xv + 510 pp. Gould & Lincoln: Boston.
 Rochebrune, A.-T. and J. Mabille. 1885. Diagnoses de mollusques nouveaux, recueillis par les membres de la mission du Cap Horn et M. Lebrun, Préparateur au Muséum, chargé d'une mission à Santa-Cruz de Patagonie. Bulletin de la Société Philomathique de Paris (7)9: 100-111
 Cooper, J. E. and H. B. Preston. 1910. Diagnoses of new species of marine and freshwater shells from the Falkland Islands, including descriptions of two new genera of marine Pelecypoda. Annals and Magazine of Natural History (8)5: 110–114, pl. 4.
 Preston, H. B. 1913. Descriptions of fifteen new species and varieties of marine shells from the Falkland Islands. Annals and Magazine of Natural History (8)11: 218–223, pl. 4.

External links
 King, P. P. and W. J. Broderip. 1832. Description of the Cirrhipeda, Conchifera and Mollusca, in a collection formed by the officers of H.M.S. Adventure and Beagle employed between the years 1826 and 1830 in surveying the southern coasts of South America. Zoological Journal 5: 332–349
 Zelaya D.G. (2004) The genus Margarella Thiele, 1893 (Gastropoda: Trochidae) in the southwestern Atlantic Ocean. The Nautilus 118(3): 112-120.
 

violacea
Gastropods described in 1832